Helicanthes is a monotypic genus of flowering plants belonging to the family Loranthaceae. The only species is Helicanthes elastica.

Its native range is India.

References

Loranthaceae
Loranthaceae genera
Monotypic Santalales genera